Stan Jones (10 June 1922 – 12 July 1995) was a British racing cyclist. He rode in the 1955 Tour de France.

References

1922 births
1995 deaths
British male cyclists
Place of birth missing